Lucinda Davis (c. 1848-after 1937) was a slave who grew up in the Creek Indian culture. She spoke the Muskogee Creek language fluently. The main information source was from an interview in the summer of 1937, at which time she was guessed to be 89 years old. Lucinda's parents were owned by two different Creek Indians. Being enslaved so young without her parents, she never found out her birthplace, nor the time of her birth. Her mother was born free in African when she escaped her captors either by running away or buying back her freedom, the white enslaver, who was also the mother's rapist and father of Lucinda, sold their child to Tuskaya-hiniha. Lucinda was brought up in the Creek family she was sold to.

Tuskaya-hiniha
Tuskaya-hiniha means "head man warrior"; he farmed and sold corn from his good-sized farm. Shortly before the American Civil War, Lucinda's master became blind, which led many of his slaves to run away. Lucinda remained with her master throughout the war and even after she was freed, because she was young and had no prospects. Tuskaya-hiniha initially bought Lucinda so she could look after the baby in the family. The baby wasn't old enough to have a name, so for the time being, they all called him "Istilusti", which means "little man". The naming of boys was important in the Creeks' culture.

Creek Indian traditions and culture
Tuskaya-hiniha's house was a log with a dirt floor and a bush roof. All the food was eaten and cooked in the yard in big pots. One of the dishes made was sofki. First, corn would be pounded very fine; then it would be poured into water, then the skin would be drained off. After that, the grits would be soaked and boiled and left to stand, at which point it is ready to serve. Sometimes they would put pounded hickory meats into the sofki. This particular meal was made in large portions, and anyone who was hungry was allowed some. If there were guests, they were allowed as much as they wanted; in fact, it was expected for them to do so. If they didn't, Tuskaya-hiniha would be mad.

Dances
The dances were different types of banga. For instance, there is the chicken dance which is called Tolosabanga. The Istifanibanga is where everyone dresses up, and then they pretend they're skeletons and "raw heads" who are coming to get you. The next dance could have been one of the ritual dances, but it sounds more as though Lucinda was young and didn't know reckless partying. This dance is known as the "drunk dance"; none of the good people dance to this one. Those who do dance fumble around "wrasslin' and huggin'" and they sing about going over to sleep at someone else's house, then shout, "We aren't wrong because we are drunk and don't know what we are doing" and such. The really bad ones go off into the woods. This action angered the good people, to the point where some of the people had killings over it. One time the husband or father of a woman, who went to the woods with a man, got beaten, and the rims of her ears sliced off. It was said to be a rumor, but Lucinda was brushing a girl's hair one time and saw her ears were mostly gone.

Slavery
The way the Creeks treated slaves was considered a much different and kinder form of slavery than the way the white Americans, Cherokee, or Choctaw went about it. Families could work under different slave owners and did not have to live on the same property as whom they worked for. The slaves worked quite hard and were paid, but had to give most of their pay to their owners, being allowed to keep a small amount. Lucinda was treated as a family member and did her duties. Her responsibility was taking care of the baby, amongst being an extra hand for cleaning and cooking here and there. She was not beaten or disrespected. It was understood what was needed of her, and she followed along.

More of her life
She was an eyewitness to the Battle of Honey Springs that occurred near her home in the summer of 1864. Honey Springs was down "the road" (the main, big dirt road her master took to trade corn and get clothing) to the closest trade town. By this time, Tuskaya-hiniha was blind, and most of his slaves had runoff. One morning, before the sun rose, Lucinda was with the baby boy pushing him on the swing, and a man on a horse ran over the hill calling the battle cry to warn all of what was coming. Tuskaya-hiniha heard it, and the family (including Lucinda and the remaining slaves) quickly readied the important necessities—meats, pots, corn, and blankets—which they loaded into a wagon and went on their way. The rainy weather was not helpful as it resulted in mud and the family had to pull off and wait it out. While they waited, Confederate soldiers passed their way with big guns. The Yankees burned down most of Honey Springs. The night passed with the lullaby of gunfire, and then they headed back home the next day. Upon arrival, they found their chickens and hogs were undisturbed and everything else to be fine; apparently, the soldiers had no time to take a thing.

The war wasn't over yet, and the family packed up and moved on to be out of danger. The road was filled with wagons, and the rain began once again. The wagons traveled in packs, and when one pack ran into the other because of the muddy, rutted road, the people would put all the horses and mules together and pull the wagon out. Not only was the road muddy, but it was rutted in a bad way from the trampling of many marching soldiers. During the nights, there would be group meals; all the women and slaves gathered and cooked the food in large pots. The men were so worn-out and hungry that by the time they were through eating, there wasn't any food left for the women and slaves.

The family traveled north, and Canada became the destination. They arrived, but there were no free houses or hospitalities that weren't already taken up by the soldiers; there weren't enough for the soldiers. Some soldiers camped out, and the Indians camped near them. Lucinda did not learn any English until after the war; all she knew was the Creek language. The soldiers were singing and Lucinda did not know what about it, so she asked one of the elders. He replied, "I wish I was in Dixie, look away, away." Lucinda then asked, "Where's Dixie?" The old Indian laughed and talked to the soldiers, who also laughed, and Lucinda was told no more.

The following day of their travels brought them to a big river raised from all the previous rain. Lucinda had never seen so much water. The men got some boats to put materials in, then floated the wagons across with the mules and horses swimming alongside; Lucinda thought they would be drowned because she had never experienced such a crossing.

The place they came to had many vacant homes, probably because many people left on account of the war. The Indian soldiers would quit the army and run away in groups, raiding houses as they went, taking everything they saw and killing any in their way. The families who Lucinda was with would always send scouters to look at the home to see if it were vacant and livable, but mainly because it was liable that there was already a scout of someone else's in there. Some houses had fresh graves. They didn't stay there. One house, Tuskaya-hiniha's wife peeked in, and saw that the previous owners were still in it, lying dead all over the floor. They decided to move on to another house, promptly.

Finally, a decent house came to be, a little cabin. Lucinda was now the only slave left of Tuskaya-hiniha's. The family lived there for over two years and harvested two crops of corn. They had a neighbor known as 'Mr. Walker' who'd kill wild boar in the forest and catch fish with his bare hands after giving them black root. So the family had as much meat as they could handle

The war died out; Lucinda was unsure of when—especially since she was living so peacefully again. Lucinda was freed, but stayed with her master until a day came when three men on horseback came and spoke with Tuskaya-hiniha. After some discussion, Tuskaya-hiniha informed Lucinda she was going with the men and finding her family. Before the group crossed the river, the men tied her to her horse so she would not fall off. She again thought she would not reach the other side alive.

Thanks to the Creek agency, she was reunited with her ma and pa. She stayed with her parents until she was an adult and her parents had died. Lucinda married Andrew Davis at the Gibson station. They had many children, though only two were still living in 1937. Her son got in trouble with the law and was imprisoned at the McAlester prison. He was released because he was a 'trusty' (meaning he acted well and was trusted by the guards), and the prison allowed him to leave and marry a woman who had lots of property.

Age was sneaking in, and Lucinda became blind. It was confusing how the other women played in, but after Lucinda's husband died, she moved in with a woman named Josephine, where she wouldn't be required to do much. Josephine's children quickly became a loud nuisance to Lucinda and her sensitive ears. She didn't like their manners because they were different from what she had grown up with within the Creek tradition. If the children had been with the Indians, the elders would have whacked the child on the head if they did wrong "because the elders knew best",-in living memory of Lucinda, those were her words.

One source hints that her death took place in Tulsa, Oklahoma, under the care of her daughter.

See also
 Slave narrative
 African American literature

External links 
 Nathaniel Turner
 Memory
 Lucinda Davis Tulsa, Oklahoma from xroads.virginia.edu
 "North American Slave Narratives"
 "Born Into Slavery"
 "American Slave Narratives" 
 "Voices From Slavery"

19th-century American slaves
People who wrote slave narratives
1840s births
1930s deaths
Date of birth missing
20th-century African-American people